One-wall handball, also known as 1-wall, wallball or international fronton is an indirect style of a ball game where the player hits a small rubber ball with their hand against a wall. The goal of the game is to score more points than the opponent. The player then hits the ball, and the ball bounces off the wall and the floor within court lines, if the opponent fails to return the ball, the player scores a point. The sport was created to bring varieties, such as American handball, Basque pelota, Patball, Gaelic handball, Pêl-Law (Welsh handball) and Valencian frontó.

Courtfield 

International fronton uses the most basic courtfield layout of the indirect style: one wall where the ball must bounce.

There must be some free space out the courtfield  for the players to play balls that are risking to bounce twice.

At  from the fronton wall there is a line on the ground, the fault line. The serving player must throw the ball before that line, and the ball must surpass it after bouncing on the fronton.

At  from the fronton there is another line on the ground, the back line, which the ball may not bounce from.

In agreement with American handball (and unlike Basque pelota and Valencian frontó) there is no left or back wall, the ball may bounce on the lines, and, specially, there is no line on the fronton for the ball to ball over.

Ball 
The One Wall ball / International fronton ball ('big ball') is a synthetic one, without any default colour. According to the GAA Handball 1-Wall playing rules [As of January 2019] (which is in line with United States Handball Association playing rules), the ball used shall be in line with the following: 
 Material. The material should be rubber or synthetic material.
 Colour. Colour is optional.
 Size. 1 and 7/8-inch diameter, with a variation of 1/32-inch, +/-
 Weight. The ball shall be 61 grams, with a variation of 3 grams, +/-
 Rebound. Rebound from free fall, 70-inch drop to a hardwood floor is 48 to 52 inches at a Temperature of 68 degrees F.

This ball is also used in the 'Big Ball' grades at the World Handball Championships organised by the World Handball Council. The One wall ball is widely available - manufacturers of the One Wall ball include O'Neills, Decathlon 'Urball' brand, MacSports 'Challenger' brand & Sky Bounce.  The 'small ball' (mainly used in 4-Wall American handball/Gaelic handball competitions) is also used in the 'small ball' one-wall/wallball grades at the World Championships.

Rules 
Two players (1 against 1) or four players (2 against 2) play to score points until one of them attain two sets (composed by 21 points).

(In case of a tie, 1-1 sets, a third set is played, where the first service is done by the winner of the previous set)

Players strike the ball with the hand so that it bounces on the fronton and falls into the courtfield. Whoever fails to do so commits a fault and so loses a point, then the opponent serves.

A fault is committed if:
 The player hits the ball with any other part of the body but the hand,
 The ball doesn't bounce on the fronton,
 The ball's first bounce on the ground is out the courtfield,
 The player strikes the ball after a second bounce on the ground.

Competitions 
There are several major international competitions held in the sport, in addition to clubs/communities/regional associations across the globe hosting their own local/regional tournaments. 

The European 1-Wall Tour is a Wallball circuit around Europe. Six to eight nations host an Open each year, each one inclusive and encouraging with grades for top senior players right through to beginners.

The Handball International Championships are organised by the CIJB (also known as the International Ball game Confederation) annually with the country federations that are part of the CIJB represented (Argentina, Belgium, Colombia, Ecuador, France, Italy, Mexico, Netherlands, Spain, Uruguay and England).

A World Championships for the sport is also organised by the World Handball Council every three years (with the World Handball Council representing the handball federations of USA (United States Handball Association), Ireland (GAA Handball Ireland), Canada (Canadian Handball Association), Australia, Japan, Puerto Rico and Czech Republic) although players representing countries not formally part of the council are welcome to take part in the council's World Championships.

Upcoming Major tournaments 
 2023 European Youth 1-Wall Championships, organised by the European 1-Wall Tour
 2022-23 European 1-Wall Tour Stops incl. Dutch Open and UK Open & commencement of 2023-24 Tour season
 2023 GAA World Games taking place in Derry, Northern Ireland [TBC if there will be handball events at the World Games]
 2023 CIJB World Cup, taking place in Valencia, Spain
 2023 Irish Wallball Nationals, organised by GAA Handball
 2023 US Wallball Nationals [big ball], organised by the United States Handball Association
 2023 US One-Wall Nationals [small ball], organised by the United States Handball Association
 2024 World Handball Championships, organised by the World Handball Council

See also 
 Handball International Championships
 American handball
 Basque pelota
 Gaelic handball
 Pêl-law (Welsh handball)
 Valencian frontó
 UK Wallball
 European 1-Wall Tour
International Ball Game Confederation (CIJB)
UK Wallball
GAA Handball
Valencian Pilota Federation (Fedpival)
United States Handball Association

References

External links 
 Muurkaatsen, 1-wall

Ball games
Individual sports
Team sports
Valencian pilota competitions